Cut Out Shapes may refer to:
 Cut Out Shapes (band), English alternative rock band
 Cut Out Shapes (song), a song by English post-punk band Magazine